is a railway station in the city of Nasukarasuyama, Tochigi, Japan, operated by the East Japan Railway Company (JR East).

Lines

Station layout
The station consists of one side platform serving a single track. There is no station building. The station is unattended.

History
The station opened on 1 June 1954.

Surrounding area
Ryumon-no-taki waterfalls
Taihei-ji

See also
 List of railway stations in Japan

References

External links

 JR East Station information 

Railway stations in Tochigi Prefecture
Railway stations in Japan opened in 1954
Karasuyama Line
Nasukarasuyama
Stations of East Japan Railway Company